Shoot Twice is a 1969 Italian Western film directed by Nando Cicero and starring Klaus Kinski and Antonio Sabàto.

Cast
 Klaus Kinski - Dingus / aka Victor Barrett
 Antonio Sabàto - Luke Barrett
 Cristina Galbó - Luke's wife
 José Calvo - Russel (as Pepe Calvo)
 Emma Baron - Luke's Mother
 Milo Quesada
 Franco Leo
 Linda Sini
 Narciso Ibáñez Menta
 Franco Beltramme
 Damián Rabal
 Maite Matalonga
 Claudia Rivelli
 Carlos Ronda
 Gastone Pescucci
 Gianni Pulone (as Giancarlo Pulone)
 Gaetano Scala
 José Palomo
 Ettore Bruson
   Nino Nini
 Antonietta Fiorito
 Pino Sciacqua (as Giuseppe Sciacqua)
 Sergio De Vecchi
 Ettore Broschi

Releases
Wild East released this alongside And God Said to Cain in a limited edition R0 NTSC DVD in 2013.

References

External links

1969 films
1969 Western (genre) films
Spanish Western (genre) films
1960s Italian-language films
Spaghetti Western films
Films directed by Nando Cicero
Films shot in Almería
1960s Italian films